Webb Peak may refer to:

 Webb Peak (Palmer Land)
 Webb Peak (Victoria Land)